Events in the year 1722 in Norway.

Incumbents
Monarch: Frederick IV

Events
17 April - Ditlev Vibe was appointed Governor-general of Norway.
May - The Norwegian Slottsloven commission was dissolved.

Undated

Utne Hotel in Utne is founded (Norway's oldest hotel in continuous operation).

Arts and literature

Births

2 May - Gerhard Schøning, historian (died 1780).

Deaths

See also

References